The Hubertec Thermik is a German ultralight trike, designed and produced by Hubertec of Aach, Rhineland-Palatinate. The aircraft is supplied as a complete ready-to-fly-aircraft.

The company is an industrial prototyping and exercise machine specialist that decided to produce an ultralight trike design as a sideline project.

Design and development
Intended for self-launching and soaring flight, the Thermik was designed to comply with the Fédération Aéronautique Internationale microlight category, the German 120 kg ultralight class and the US FAR 103 Ultralight Vehicles rules.

The Thermik features a cable-braced hang glider-style high-wing, weight-shift controls, a single-seat open cockpit without a cockpit fairing, tricycle landing gear and a single engine in pusher configuration.

The aircraft is made from bolted-together aluminum tubing, with its double surface wing covered in Dacron sailcloth. Its  span Bautek Pico two-place wing is supported by a single tube-type kingpost and uses an "A" frame weight-shift control bar. The powerplant is a single cylinder, air-cooled, two-stroke,  Simonini engine.

The aircraft can utilize any hang glider wing that can support , although the prototype used a Bautek Pico two-place wing.

An alternative version that fits a paraglider wing is also available, flying as a powered parachute.

Specifications (Thermik with Bautek Pico wing)

References

External links

Hubertec Thermik photographs

2000s German sport aircraft
2000s German ultralight aircraft
Single-engined pusher aircraft
Ultralight trikes
Powered parachutes